Patoleo (singular: Patoli; Goan Konkani: पातोळ्यो) are stuffed turmeric leaf wraps, a dish which is mostly prepared on the western coast of India and other Indian Ocean islands. The stuffing is made from grated coconut, rice and jaggery, and cooked by wrapping and steaming in turmeric leaves.

Hindu community 

Konkani-speaking Hindus prepare  on the second Sunday of Shravan, on Nag Panchami and on Hartalika, the eve of Ganesh Chaturthi. Salt-free  are offered to the goddess Parvati, who, according to a legend, is said to have a strong craving for these sweets during her pregnancy. 

Served with leaves on, in a dish. They are mainly eaten after removing the leaf and are eaten with the vegetarian festive lunch during the Hindu festivals.. A version of this dish is made in Kerala for the holy festival of Onam and is called Ely Ada.

Christian community 

The simplest version of the Goan Catholic  is prepared by smearing parboiled rice paste on fresh turmeric leaves to which a filling of freshly grated coconut and coconut jaggery is added. These are served hot on a platter with the leaves on and eaten after peeling them off. They are often accompanied with tea or other hot beverages.

The Catholic feast of the Assumption of the Blessed Virgin Mary (a holy day of obligation) which falls on 15 August coincides with the Independence Day of India.

The tradition of distributing  to neighbours and friends after the arrival of a new born in the family is still retained by some Goans. In bygone times,  were also distributed to mark the completion of construction of a house in Goa. Some Goan Catholic families send  to a house where people are mourning the death of a family member.
Until modern medicine,  was often used to help children with whooping cough.

The East Indian Catholics call it  or 'East Indian leaf cakes'. The Mangalorean Catholics say  in their accent.

Gallery

References

External links
Recipe: Patoleo in saffron leaves
Goan cuisine
Recipe: Patoli in turmeric leaves

Konkani cuisine